Dermanak or Darmank or Dormonak may refer to:
 Dermanak, Markazi
 Dermanak, Sistan and Baluchestan